The Venetian army was the army of the city-state of Venice, and later of the Republic of Venice and its dominions. During the Republic's early centuries, it was a force comprising an urban militia. 

During Venice's imperial age in the Late Middle Ages and the Venetian expansion into mainland Italy (Terraferma) in the 15th century, its conflicts with the Duchy of Milan, the Papacy, and even France and Hungary, required the Venetian government to raise armies of tens of thousands. Given Venice's small population and the Venetians' traditional preoccupation with naval affairs, these armies were mostly composed of mercenaries (such as the Balkan  or the companies of the various ). Venetian noblemen served as commanders in or accompanied these armies as representatives of the Republic, but for most of subsequent Venetian history, their captain-generals were usually distinguished mercenary captains. A further problem for Venice was the need to station permanent garrisons in their overseas colonies. During the Ottoman–Venetian Wars, primacy was usually held by the commanders of the Venetian navy, and the army forces served without distinction as shipborne infantry, in the field, or as garrisons of fortresses. During these conflicts, the Venetian forces also incorporated a number of allied forces from other Italian states.

In the 16th century, the local militias were organized into the  system and a small permanent peacetime force of professional soldiers was created, to be augmented with mercenaries in wartime. During the 17th century, the Republic hired foreign regiments—usually from Germany or Switzerland—for service by treaty with foreign princes. This system lasted, with some changes, until the Fall of the Republic of Venice to Napoleon in 1797.

See also
 Military history of the Republic of Venice
 Venetian navy

Sources
 
 
  
 
 
 
 

1797 disestablishments
Disbanded armies
 Army
Medieval armies